The Administration of Justice Act 1964 (c 42) is an Act of the Parliament of the United Kingdom that reorganised the judicial arrangements in the Greater London area to reflect major local government changes. Among the provisions of the Act, which came into force on 1 April 1965, were the creation of the offices of Lord Lieutenant of Greater London and High Sheriff of Greater London.

References

United Kingdom Acts of Parliament 1964